Bao'an Stadium station is a station on Line 1 of the Shenzhen Metro in Shenzhen, Guangdong Province, China. The station opened on 15 June 2011. The Chinese name 宝体 is short for 宝安体育馆 (Bao'an Stadium,). The station serves the nearby Bao'an Stadium.

Station layout

Exits

References

External links
 Shenzhen Metro Bao'an Stadium Station  (Chinese)
 Shenzhen Metro Bao'an Stadium Station  (English)

Railway stations in Guangdong
Shenzhen Metro stations
Bao'an District
Railway stations in China opened in 2011